Martin Schreiber may refer to:
Martin E. Schreiber (1904–1997), Republican legislator and Milwaukee alderman
Martin J. Schreiber (born 1939), his son, Democratic legislator and Governor of Wisconsin between 1977 and 79
Martin H. M. Schreiber (born 1946), Czech-American photographer